623 Chimaera is a minor planet orbiting the Sun.

References

External links
 
 

Chimaera asteroids
Chimaera
Chimaera
XC-type asteroids (Tholen)
19070122